The mathematical analysis of partial differential equations uses analytical techniques to study partial differential equations. The subject has connections to and motivations from physics and differential geometry, the latter through the branches of global and geometric analysis.

Useful literature
Tao, Terence. Nonlinear Dispersive Equations: Local and Global Analysis. CBMS regional series in mathematics, 2006.

Useful links
math.AP , subject code for Analysis of PDEs at arXiv
Activity Group on Analysis of Partial Differential Equations at Society for Industrial and Applied Mathematics (SIAM)

Partial differential equations